Sir Christopher Hammon Paine FRCP FRCR (born 28 August 1935) is a British medical doctor.

Paine, the grandson of Samuel Vestey, 2nd Baron Vestey, was educated at Eton and Merton College, Oxford.

He was President of the Royal Society of Medicine (1996–1998) and of the British Medical Association (2000–2001).  He was made a Knight Bachelor in the 1995 New Year Honours, "for services to medicine".

References 

1935 births
Living people
20th-century British medical doctors
Knights Bachelor
Place of birth missing (living people)
Presidents of the British Medical Association
Presidents of the Royal Society of Medicine
Alumni of Merton College, Oxford